The New York Giants are a National Football League (NFL) franchise founded in the 1925 season, the NFL's sixth. Eleven years later, the league introduced the NFL Draft after team owners voted on it in 1935. The intention of the draft was to make the NFL more competitive, as a few stronger teams, including the Giants, had an advantage in signing young players because they were able to offer higher salaries and an opportunity to compete for championships. Since that first draft, the Giants have selected 82 players in the first round. The team's first-round pick in the inaugural NFL Draft was Art Lewis, a tackle from Ohio University; he was the 9th overall selection. In the most recent draft, held in 2022, the Giants chose Oregon defensive end Kayvon Thibodeaux and Alabama offensive tackle Evan Neal.

Officially known as the "NFL Annual Player Selection Meeting", but more often called the NFL Draft, the event is the NFL's primary mechanism for distributing newly professional players finished with their college football careers to its teams. The draft order is determined based on the previous season's standings; the teams with the worst win–loss records receive the earliest picks. Teams that qualified for the NFL playoffs select after non-qualifiers, and their order depends on how far they advanced. The final two selections in the first round are reserved for the Super Bowl runner-up and champion. Draft picks are tradable, and players or other picks can be acquired with them.

Of the 82 players drafted by the Giants in the first round, 27 played at one of the running back positions. Of these, 10 were halfbacks and six were fullbacks, and the remaining 11 are credited as backs, blocking backs, or running backs. Among other frequently drafted positions, the Giants have chosen 10 offensive tackles, eight defensive backs, seven defensive ends, six wide receivers, five defensive tackles, and five quarterbacks. Five of the Giants' first-round picks attended the University of Notre Dame, more than any other college. Four picks came from Miami, while nine universities have had three players selected. The Giants have held the first overall pick twice, in 1951 and 1965, selecting Kyle Rote and Tucker Frederickson. Three of the team's first-round picks—George Connor, Frank Gifford, and Lawrence Taylor—have been elected to the Pro Football Hall of Fame.

The Giants did not draft a player in the first round on 11 occasions. Two of those picks, for the 1967 and 1968 drafts, were traded to the Minnesota Vikings in 1967 as part of a deal for quarterback Fran Tarkenton. During the 1974 season, the Giants dealt their 1975 first-round choice to the Dallas Cowboys for another quarterback, Craig Morton. In another case when the Giants used first-round draft picks to trade for a quarterback, the team acquired 2004 first overall pick Eli Manning from the San Diego Chargers, in a deal that included their 2004 and 2005 first-round picks; the Giants had already selected Philip Rivers with the 2004 pick, the fourth in that year's draft. The Giants used multiple first-round selections in 1951, 1972, 1984, 2019, and 2022; in the second instance; they gained a selection by trading Tarkenton back to the Vikings.

Key

Player selections

Notes
From 1947 to 1958, the NFL held an annual lottery that decided which team would select first overall in the draft with a "bonus pick". The Giants won the bonus lottery in 1951, giving them the first choice in that year's draft.
The 1951 draft was the second in which Spavital was selected. The Chicago Cardinals had chosen him in the first round of the 1948 draft. Spavital was one of 28 Baltimore Colts players who became eligible for the 1951 draft when that franchise became defunct.
The Giants traded their 1954 first-round draft pick to the Green Bay Packers.
The Giants traded their 1956 first-round draft pick to the Los Angeles Rams.
In 1956, the Giants traded their 1957 first-round draft pick to the Rams in exchange for defensive end Andy Robustelli.
In 1959, the Giants traded their 1961 first-round draft pick to the Baltimore Colts in exchange for quarterback George Shaw. The Colts later traded the selection to the San Francisco 49ers for end Dee Mackey.
In 1961, the Giants acquired a second 1962 first-round draft pick from the Minnesota Vikings in exchange for George Shaw, then traded the selection to the Rams for wide receiver Del Shofner.
In 1962, the Giants traded their 1963 first-round draft pick to the St. Louis Cardinals, along with Bill Triplett, in exchange for quarterback Ralph Guglielmi.
The Giants were awarded the first overall pick in 1967 or 1968 as compensation for the New York Jets joining the NFL as part of the league's merger with the American Football League. The choice was conditional upon the Giants selecting a quarterback; the team was allowed to trade the pick, if they received a starting quarterback in return. In 1967, the Giants traded their 1967 and 1968 first-round draft picks, their 1967 second-round pick, and a player to be named later to the Vikings in exchange for quarterback Fran Tarkenton. The New Orleans Saints were ultimately given the first overall pick in 1967 (before trading it to the Colts), dropping the Giants' former selection to second.
In 1971, the Giants traded their original 1972 first-round draft pick to the Chicago Bears in exchange for center Bob Hyland and cornerback Bennie McRae. This pick was acquired from the Vikings, along with running back Vince Clements, center Bob Grim, quarterback Norm Snead, and a second-round pick in the 1973 draft, in exchange for Tarkenton.
In 1972, the Giants traded their 1973 first- and second-round draft picks to the Cleveland Browns in exchange for defensive end Jack Gregory and defensive back Freddie Summers.
In 1974, the Giants traded their 1975 first-round draft pick to the Dallas Cowboys in exchange for quarterback Craig Morton.
This pick was acquired from the Washington Redskins in exchange for second- and fifth-round draft picks.
The Giants selected quarterback Dave Brown in the first round of the 1992 supplemental draft, and as a result forfeited their 1993 first-round draft pick.
During the 2001 draft, the Giants acquired this pick from the Indianapolis Colts in exchange for their original first-round selection (30th in the draft) and picks in rounds three and six.
During the 2002 draft, the Giants acquired this pick from the Tennessee Titans in exchange for their original first-round selection (15th in the draft) and a fourth-round pick.
After drafting Rivers, the Giants traded him to the San Diego Chargers, along with their 2004 third-round pick and 2005 first- and fifth-round choice, in exchange for quarterback Eli Manning, the first overall pick.
During the 2006 draft, the Giants acquired this pick from the Pittsburgh Steelers, along with third- and fourth-round selections, in exchange for their original first-round choice (25th in the draft).
This pick was acquired from the Browns, along with safety Jabrill Peppers and a third-round draft pick, in exchange for wide receiver Odell Beckham Jr.
During the 2019 draft, the Giants acquired this pick from the Seattle Seahawks in exchange for three draft picks.
During the 2021 draft, the Giants acquired this pick from the Bears, along with a fifth-round selection and 2022 first- and fourth-round picks, in exchange for their original first-round choice (11th in the draft).
This pick was acquired from the Bears in the teams' 2021 trade.

References
General

Specific

New York Giants
first-round draft picks
New York Giants players